Lord of Abercrombie was a title in the Peerage of Scotland that was created on 12 December 1647. It became extinct on the death of the 2nd Lord in 1681.

Lords of Abercrombie (1647)
James Sandilands, 1st Lord Abercrombie (d. after 1658)
James Sandilands, 2nd Lord Abercrombie (d. 1681)

See also
Baron Abercromby

References

Extinct lordships of Parliament
1647 establishments in Scotland
1681 disestablishments in Scotland
Noble titles created in 1647